The Carlos Palanca Memorial Awards for Literature winners in the year 1999 (rank, title of winning entry, name of author):

English division
Novel
Grand prize: "Smaller and Smaller Circles" by Ma. Felisa H. Batacan 

Short story
First prize: "Life Before X" by Angelo Rodriguez Lacuesta
Second prize: "Flood" by Ma. Romina M. Gonzales
Third prize: "Rhinoplasty" by Maria L.M. Fres-Felix

Poetry
First prize: "The Taste of One Wave" by John Labella
Second prize: "Native Tongue" by Ulysses B. Aparece
Third prize: "Reaching Destination" by Nerisa Del Carmen Guevarra 

Short story for children
First prize: "The Boy Who Had Five Lolas" by Grace D. Chong
Second prize: "Magnificent Benito and His Two Front Teeth" by Michelle G. Rivera and Augie Rivera
Third prize: "Danny Goes Home" by Michelle Antoinette S. Tom

Essay
First prize: "Once Upon a Bright Happy Boy" by Melba Padilla Maggay
Second prize: "Remembering Villa" by Alfred A. Yuson
Third prize: "The Rite of Strings" by Lourd Ernest de Veyra

Full Length Play
First prize: "Original Grace" by Elsa M. Coscolluela
Second prize: "Halakata, MS.D" by Jhoanna Lynn B. Cruz
Third prize: "Legend of the Cross" by Ametta Suarez Taguchi

One-act play
First prize: "Medea of Syquijor" by Leoncio P. Deriada
Second prize: "Blind Names" by Crispin Ramos
Third prize: "Sayonara Lola Bashang" by John Joseph S. Coronel

Filipino division
Novel in Filipino
Grand prize: "Ang Kaulayaw ng Agila" by Lilia Quindoza Santiago

Short story in Filipino
First prize: "Sinsil Boys" by German V. Gervacio
Second prize: "BI" by Marco A.V. Lopez
Third prize: "Dalantao" by Alwin C. Aguirre 

Poetry in Filipino
"Kamatayon sang Isa ka Kalye" by Leoncio P. Deriada

Short story for children in Filipino
First prize: "Tatlong Ungas" by Rene O. Villanueva
Second prize: "Ang Ballet Dancer at ang Basketball Player" by Nora Imelda C. Bautista
Third prize: "Xilef" by Augie Rivera 

Essay in Filipino
First prize: "Bakasin Mo Sa Bakasyon" by Lamberto E. Antonio
Second prize: "Abante Sa Aking Buhay" by Ariel Dim. Dorlongan
Third prize: "Tatlong Lumang Sutana" by Niles Jordan Breis

Full-length play in Filipino
First prize: "Luna, Isang Romansang Aswang" by Rodolfo C. Vera
Second prize: "Despedida De Soltera" by Liza C. Magtoto
Third prize: "Bagting" by Edward P. Perez

One-act play in Filipino
First prize: "Watawat" by Rene O. Villanueva
Second prize: "Unang Dalaw" by Edward P. Perez
Third prize: "Wan Chai Yuki" by Dominic D. Manrique

Teleplay
First prize: "Babaeng Tilapia, Natagpuan sa Coastal Road" by Nicolas B. Pichay
Second prize: "Banta" by Eli Rueda Guieb III
Third prize: "Ayala Avenue" by Isagani A. Amoncio

Screenplay<
First prize: "Si Maria at si Magdalena" by Ramon Felipe Sarmiento
Second prize: "Karumal-Dumal" by Diosdado Sa. Anzures Jr.
Third prize: "Syota ng Masa" by Ronaldo C. Tumbokon

Ilokano Short story
First prize: "Dayyeng Dagiti Karayan" by Ricarte A. Agnes
Second prize: "Dagiti Inna nga Umulog iti Sardam" by Reynaldo A. Duque
Third prize: "Murkat" by Roy V. Aragon

Cebuano Short story
First prize: "Ting-Ani" by Ricardo I. Patalinhug
Second prize: "Sambunot" by Leonilo E. Estimo
Third prize: "Ang Hari sa Tulay" by Oscar C. Pineda

Hiligaynon Short story
First prize: "Ang Likum sang Isla San Miguel" by Alice Tan Gonzales
Second prize: "Ulan sa Bulan sang Abril" by Jonathan P. Jurilla

Kabataan essay
English
First prize: "Learn from the Oldies and Teach the Kiddies" by Juan Ruffo D. Chong
Second prize: "Got Pinoy" by Catherine Candano
Third prize: "Cultivating Our Roots" by Melissa Mae B. Santos 
Third prize: "Ang Papel ng Kabataan sa Pangangalaga ng Kahalagahang Pangkultura ng Filipino" by Melecio P. Vizcarra Jr.

More winners by year

References
 

1999
Palanca Awards, 1999